Thomas Workman (June 17, 1813 – October 9, 1889) was a Quebec businessman and political figure. He represented Montreal Centre in the 1st Canadian Parliament and Montreal West from 1875 to 1878 as a Liberal member.

He was born in Ballymacash, Ireland in 1813 and came to Montreal, where his brothers had already settled, in 1827. In 1834, he was hired as a clerk in a hardware company operated by John Frothingham and his brother William; he became a partner in 1843 and sole owner in 1859. He also served as president of the Molson Bank and a director of the Sun Mutual Life Insurance Company in Montreal, serving as president from 1871 to 1889. He served as a volunteer to help put down the Lower Canada Rebellion. In 1866, he was named justice of the peace. He was elected to the House of Commons in 1867, but did not run again until an 1875 by-election in Montreal West after the sitting member was unseated.

He died from diabetes in Montreal in 1889. He had supported McGill College during his life and left a large sum from his estate to the college and other charities.

References
 
 

1813 births
1889 deaths
Members of the House of Commons of Canada from Quebec
Liberal Party of Canada MPs
Irish emigrants to pre-Confederation Quebec
Immigrants to Lower Canada
Canadian justices of the peace
Burials at Mount Royal Cemetery